Freeholder Party of the Czech Republic (SsČR) is a centre-right conservative political party in the Czech Republic. The party considers itself to be a successor to Czechoslovak Traders' Party. The party has one Senator.

History
SsČR was established in 2008. The party received 4 544 votes (0.19%) in 2009 European Parliament election and thus won no seat. The party didn't take part in 2010 election and supported Civic Democratic Party instead. SsČR took part in 2012 regional elections received 1 seat in Liberec Region. Another member was elected as candidate of Christian and Democratic Union – Czechoslovak People's Party. SsČR received 13 041 votes (0.26%) and no seat in 2013 Czech legislative election.

Billionaire Ivo Valenta was elected to Senate in 2014 as candidate of SsČR. Valenta became a sponsor of the party since then and negotiated an agreement between SsČR and Party of Free Citizens to participate in joint list for 2016 regional elections. The coalition received 2% nationwide but succeeded in Zlín region.

On 21 February 2017 Freeholder Party agreed to participate in 2017 Czech legislative election together with Civic Democratic Party. The coalition received 11% of votes and came second but Freeholders didn't receive any seats.

Election results

Chamber of Deputies

European Parliament

Presidential

Footnotes

External links
Official page

Conservative parties in the Czech Republic
Political parties established in 2008
Eurosceptic parties in the Czech Republic
2008 establishments in the Czech Republic
Right-wing parties in the Czech Republic
Svobodní
Civic Democratic Party (Czech Republic)